The Aberdeenshire Shield, like the Aberdeenshire Cup, is a competition for Aberdeenshire Football clubs. The competition was first held in 1990–91 Highland Football League season and the winners were Cove Rangers. 

The Aberdeenshire Shield was originally contested between only Highland League clubs. However in recent years, teams such as Aberdeen, Peterhead, Banks O' Dee and Aberdeen University have entered the competition. The final of the tournament is normally contested at a suitable neutral venue. 

The current holders are Fraserburgh, and they are the most successful club overall, with nine wins.

List of winners 

Football cup competitions in Scotland
Football in Aberdeen
Football in Aberdeenshire